The 1953–54 Serie C was the sixteenth edition of Serie C, the third highest league in the Italian football league system.

Final classification

Footnotes

Serie C seasons
3
Italy